The 1938 Clinton High School, in Clinton, Louisiana, at 12525 Cedar, was built in 1938.  It was designed by architect Herman J. Duncan.  It was listed on the National Register of Historic Places in 2005.

It is Classical Revival in style.

It was deemed "significant in the area of social history because it served as the focus of Clinton's community life from its opening in 1938 until 1955, the present fifty year cutoff. Once school consolidation began in East Feliciana in the 1940s, the school played a similar role in the lives of most parish residents."

References

National Register of Historic Places in East Feliciana Parish, Louisiana
Neoclassical architecture in Louisiana
Buildings and structures completed in 1938